The Born in the U.S.A. Tour was the supporting concert tour of Bruce Springsteen's Born in the U.S.A. album. It was his longest and most successful tour to date. It featured a physically transformed Springsteen; after two years of bodybuilding, the singer had bulked up considerably. The tour was the first since the 1974 portions of the Born to Run tours without guitarist Steven Van Zandt, who decided to go solo after recording the album with the group. Van Zandt, who was replaced by Nils Lofgren, would appear a few times throughout the tour and in some of the music videos to promote the album. It was also the first tour to feature Springsteen's future wife, Patti Scialfa.

The tour started in June 1984 and went through the United States and to Canada. In March 1985 the tour went to Australia, Japan and Europe. It then headed back for a second leg of the U.S. tour in which Springsteen and the E Street Band played to sold-out professional football stadiums. The tour finished in October 1985 in Los Angeles.

The tour grossed $80–90 million overall. Of that, $34 million came from Springsteen's summer 1985 stadium dates in North America. The Born in the U.S.A. album was inside the top 10 of the Billboard 200 during the entire tour. Springsteen also was enjoying a hit single from the album (there were seven in total) during any moment of the tour. The album along with Springsteen's previous album, Nebraska, which he did not tour to promote, were performed in their entirety throughout the tour. Total attendance was 3.9 million.

Tour highlights
 June 29, Saint Paul, Minnesota–First show of the tour, including the filming of the iconic "Dancing in the Dark" music video. Patti Scialfa and Nils Lofgren make their E Street Band debuts.
 July 12, East Troy, Wisconsin–A Born in the U.S.A. outtake called "Man at the Top" was played live for the first time. It would be officially released 14 years later, on the Tracks album, in a different arrangement.
 August 5, East Rutherford, New Jersey–Springsteen played the first show of a ten-night stand at the Brendan Byrne Arena.
 August 6, East Rutherford, New Jersey–The versions of  "Nebraska" and "No Surrender" played here appeared on Live/1975-85.
 August 19, East Rutherford, New Jersey–"Reason to Believe" appeared on Live/1975-85.
 August 20, East Rutherford, New Jersey–"Tenth Avenue Freeze-Out", with the Miami Horns, appeared on Live/1975-85. Steve Van Zandt also made his first appearance with Springsteen since leaving the E Street Band, playing on the song "Two Hearts" and a cover of "Drift Away".
 August 25–29, Landover, Maryland–Springsteen played four shows over six nights here. "Be True" made its first live appearance on August 26. George Will attended one of these shows, inspiring him to write a column extolling Springsteen as an exemplar of patriotic values.
 September 14, Philadelphia–Springsteen played the first show of a six-night stand at the Spectrum.
 October 15, Vancouver, British Columbia–The show had to be stopped temporarily when unruly fans rushed the stage.
 October 19, Tacoma, Washington–For the first time since 1974, the Springsteen classic "Rosalita" was not played. It would be played infrequently on the rest of the tour.
 October 25, Los Angeles–First of seven concerts at the Los Angeles Memorial Sports Arena.
 November 16, Ames, Iowa–The Born in the U.S.A. outtake, "Sugarland", made its debut. Its only other appearance on the tour (and in concert overall) came two nights later in Lincoln, Nebraska.
December 6, Birmingham, Alabama–The Birmingham, Alabama show at the BJCC Coliseum is notable for being the only show of the entire Born in the U.S.A. tour to not sell out.
 December 14, Memphis, Tennessee–Steve Van Zandt once again played on "Two Hearts".
 January 18, Greensboro, North Carolina–Gary U.S. Bonds and Robbin Thompson made an appearance on "Twist and Shout".
 January 26, Syracuse, New York–Springsteen played his first true stadium show at the Carrier Dome, in the final U.S. show until August.
 March 21, Sydney, Australia–Springsteen played the first of eight Australian concerts.
 March 31, Brisbane, Australia–Bruce Springsteen and the E Street Band played their first stadium show at QE2 Stadium.
 April 10, Tokyo, Japan–The first of eight Japanese shows, the only time Springsteen and the E Street Band have fronted a tour in Japan.
 June 1, Slane Castle, Ireland–The first European show of the tour included the one and only time Springsteen has covered "When I Grow Up (To Be a Man)" by the Beach Boys.
 August 5, Washington, D.C.–Springsteen began his first stadium tour at R.F.K. Stadium. "Man at the Top" was played for the second and final time on the tour (after premiering one month and one year earlier at the Alpine Valley Music Theatre), before it reappeared nearly 30 years later on the closing night of the European leg of the Wrecking Ball World Tour in 2013.
 August 11, Pittsburgh, Pennsylvania–This show at Three Rivers Stadium was seen by 65,935 fans, the largest concert in Pittsburgh history.
 August 18, East Rutherford, New Jersey–Springsteen played his first concert at Giants Stadium, a venue he would visit many more times throughout his career, and which would eventually become the subject of his song "Wrecking Ball" 25 years later. This show was the first of six at the stadium on this tour.
 August 19, East Rutherford, New Jersey–"Working on the Highway", "Born to Run", "Johnny 99", and "I'm on Fire" all appeared on Live/1975-85.
 August 21, East Rutherford, New Jersey–"Bobby Jean" appeared on Live/1975-85.
 September 27, Los Angeles–A four-night stand at the Los Angeles Memorial Coliseum began. "Janey, Don't You Lose Heart" and "War" were played for the first time, with "War" being included in the Live/1975-85 set and released as a single in 1986.
 September 30, Los Angeles–"Born in the U.S.A.", "Seeds", "The River, "Darlington County", "The Promised Land", "Cover Me", and "My Hometown" all appeared on Live/1975-85.
 October 2, Los Angeles–Final show of the tour.

Broadcasts and recordings
Nearly half of Live/1975-85 consists of songs from the Born in the U.S.A. Tour, incorporating songs from the August 6, August 19, and August 20 shows in 1984, and the August 19, August 21, and September 30 shows in 1985.

Several shows have been released as part of the Bruce Springsteen Archives:
 Brendan Byrne Arena, New Jersey 1984, released May 13, 2015
 Brendan Byrne Arena, August 20, 1984, released March 2, 2018
 Los Angeles Memorial Coliseum, Sept 27, 1985, released April 5, 2019
 Brendan Byrne Arena, August 6, 1984, released September 18, 2020 
 Giants Stadium August 22, 1985, released July 23, 2021
 Brendan Byrne Arena, August 19, 1984, released August 5, 2022

Tour dates

Festivals and other miscellaneous performances
This concert was part of Slane Concert

Songs performed

Sources

Personnel
 Bruce Springsteen – lead vocals, guitars, harmonica
 Clarence Clemons – saxophone, congas, percussion, background vocals
 Garry Tallent – bass guitar
 Danny Federici – organ, glockenspiel, piano, synthesizer
 Roy Bittan – piano, synthesizer, background vocals
 Max Weinberg – drums
 Nils Lofgren – guitars, background vocals
 Patti Scialfa – background vocals, synthesizer, tambourine

Special guests
Courteney Cox (6/29/84 – danced with Springsteen on "Dancing in the Dark" which was captured in the music video)
J.T. Bowan (8/9/84)
John Entwistle (8/11/84)
Southside Johnny (8/12/84)
Steven Van Zandt (8/20/84, 12/14/84, 12/16/84, 12/17/84, 7/3/85, 7/4/85, 7/6/85, 7/7/85, 8/22/85)
The Miami Horns (8/19/84, 8/20/84, 9/14/84)
Pamela Springsteen (10/22/84 – danced with Bruce on "Dancing in the Dark")
Gary U.S. Bonds (1/18/85)
Robbin Thompson (1/18/85)
Eric Clapton (6/1/85)
Pete Townshend (6/1/85)
Jon Landau (9/29/85, 10/2/85)
Julianne Philips (10/2/85 – danced with Bruce on "Dancing in the Dark")

See also
 List of highest grossing concert tours

References

Notes

Bruce Springsteen concert tours
1984 concert tours
1985 concert tours